The Solomon Islands Act 1978 is an Act of the Parliament of the United Kingdom. The Act annexed the British Solomon Islands protectorate by providing that as from 7 July 1978 the territories comprised within the protectorate would form part of Her Majesty’s dominions under the name of Solomon Islands. The Act also provided that from the same date, Her Majesty’s Government in the United Kingdom would have no responsibility for the government of Solomon Islands.

Independence within the British Commonwealth could not be attained by a dependent territory such as the Solomon Islands protectorate without legislation passed at Westminster. The grant of independence to Solomon Islands was achieved by two separate legislative operations, namely, the passing of the Act and the making of the Solomon Islands Independence Order 1978. Together those statutes comprised Solomon Islands’ constitution at independence in 1978. At independence the country became the thirty-seventh member of the British Commonwealth of Nations.

References

History of the Solomon Islands
British Empire